Nuwa or NUWA may refer to:

Nüwa, a Chinese creator goddess
 Jingwei, a Chinese mythological character who was known as Nüwa (unrelated to the creator goddess), the daughter of the Yandi, in her former life
Kawaiisu or Nuwa, a Native American group in southern California
150 Nuwa, an asteroid
National Workers' Union of Afghanistan